For the sport shooter, see Kay Clark-Miculek

Kay Clark is a fictional character created and portrayed by Tracey Ullman. She is the character Ullman has portrayed the longest, spanning over four decades and three television programmes. The character was born out of a television sketch for a guest appearance on the British television comedy and music show Saturday Live in 1986.

Origins
Ullman says that Kay is based on a woman who worked at her bank in The Midlands. "Basically, she's forty-three, has never been touched by a man and never will be. There's always one like her in every office who sells sanitary napkins and stamps, with her nice polyester ass waddling across the room. Once, at an office party, someone got her behind the filing cabinets, and he's never lived it down. People go, 'Oh, you and Kayyy - 1982....' 'Shut up! I never did nothing with her!' I love people like that."

Kay, whilst retaining many of the same personality traits, has been reconceptualized for each television programme. In The Tracey Ullman Show (1987–1990), Kay, living in Rhode Island in the United States, works for a paper products distribution company, a job Ullman herself once had. She talks to her invalid mother on the telephone off-screen. In Tracey Takes On... (1996–1999), Kay is employed as a bank teller in Van Nuys and lives in Panorama City in Los Angeles, California. Her invalid mother communicates with a buzzer. In Tracey Ullman's Show (2016–2017), Kay, living in New Malden in London, is portrayed as an old aged pensioner. Her 103-year-old mother, not an invalid, appears on-screen for the very first time.

Biography
Kay is described an eternal optimist. "Musn't crumble, Kay." She has devoted herself to caring for her invalid mother. While she loves her mother, Kay has outbursts of hatred for her from time to time, though she's quick to scold herself for such behavior.

Kay wears clothing made from polyester, along with a pen on a string which hangs around her neck. She cuts her own hair using a ceramic kitchen bowl and scissors. Kay's mode of transportation is a moped; she is sometimes shown wearing a helmet.

The Tracey Ullman Show
Kay, a Rhode Island paper distribution company office worker, is the constant victim of her coworkers', and even boss', taunts and pranks. Kay takes it all in stride, though. She frequently checks in on her mother on the phone. "Hello, Mummy, it's (draws out) Kaaaay." We never see her mother on screen or hear her on the phone. We do know that she is an invalid. The cause of Mummy's injuries are revealed in the sketch "Kay Babysits":

Kay doesn't have any friends. It's revealed that she did have a boyfriend, Derrick, in her youth.

Tracey Takes On...
Kay is presented as a 42-year-old Californian bank teller (and sometimes branch manager) at Van Nuys Savings and Loan. She took a work transfer from the bank she worked at in England to its American branch to take advantage of the American health care system for her mother. She lives in Panorama City. Unlike her portrayal in The Tracey Ullman Show, Kay does not face the wrath of her nasty coworkers. While her Mother is not seen on screen, she is heard through a series of beeps from her bedroom. Kay's mother became an invalid after having been involved in an accident where the sidecar in which she was traveling  broke free from the motorbike Kay's father was driving. "'I didn't know the damn motorbike would part company with the sidecar, Mildred,' he shouted over his shoulder, as he sped off up Shaftesbury Avenue." Later, Kay's mother warned her: "I remember the cold, steely glint in Mother's eye as she stared up at me from her iron lung. 'Kay,' she said, 'don't ever marry. All men will try to kill you, after they've done nasty things to your downstairs areas.'" In the episode "Tracey Takes On... Death", Kay's father is revealed to have run off with her aunt, Marjorie.

Kay is an avid reader of espionage fiction. In the book Tracey Takes On, Kay's age is revealed to be 42. She seeks medical marijuana for Mother in the episode "Tracey Takes On... Smoking" and inadvertently becomes a recreational user herself. Work and acting as a caregiver have given Kay very little time for a social life. She has never lost her virginity. After she takes part in a prison pen-pal program, attorney Sydney Kross (Ullman) convinces her to marry an inmate in hopes of sparing him the death penalty. Kay follows through with the quickie wedding, but her marriage does not result in a stay of execution from the governor. Kay's husband is placed in a gas chamber, leaving her, as Ullman refers to her, as "the virgin widow." In the series finale, "Tracey Takes On... The End of the World", Kay's mother finally dies. Kay now has her freedom - "Three hours and fourteen minutes of it!" she exclaims.

Tracey Ullman's Show
Kay is presented as an OAD living in England with her mother, who is 103. Unlike in previous shows, Mother is not an invalid. She has had many medical procedures performed, though. For the first time in the character's television history, Mother appears on-screen (played by actress Joan Linder).  Kay was shown to be a year old at the time of King George VI's coronation in her first appearance in series one, making her nearly 80 years old. Kay and Mother live in New Malden.

In series two, during a flood, Kay and Mother take shelter in their attic. While looking for something to keep them warm, she discovers a postcard addressed to her from a man inviting her to the cinema. It is dated 1965.  Mother has been keeping a variety of correspondents from her for decades: a marriage proposal, acceptance of her application to a university, a job offer, and an invitation from a group of people to join them on holiday. In episode six, Kay tracks down her cousin Debbie from Australia who is doing their family tree. Kay learns that she has a large extended family. Kay has been under the impression that her only family is Mother (and Mother is keen on keeping it that way). Kay, overjoyed at the news that she has a family and the invitation from Debbie to come to Australia and meet them all, Mother (worried, and obviously lying) blurts out that Kay's father was not really her father. Her real father was a sailor. Kay is heartbroken.

References

Sources

Tracey Ullman
Tracey Ullman characters
Comedy television characters
British female characters in television
Television characters introduced in 1986
Fictional English people